Kashirampur is a census town in Pauri Garhwal District in the Indian state of Uttarakhand.

Geography

Demographics
 India census, Kashirampur had a population of 9033. Males constitute 51% of the population and females 49%. Kashirampur has an average literacy rate of 76%, higher than the national average of 59.5%: male literacy is 81%, and female literacy is 72%. In Kashirampur, 13% of the population is under 6 years of age.

References

Cities and towns in Pauri Garhwal district